Aadithya is a 1996 Indian Kannada-language action drama film written and directed by K. N. Lokachandran. The film stars Shiva Rajkumar, Neelam, Rubainaa  and Madhu Bangarappa.

The film's score and the soundtrack were scored by Rajesh Ramanath and the cinematography was by Vijay Gopal.

Cast 

 Shiva Rajkumar as Barrister Aadithya
 Rubainaa as Manjula
 Neelam as Neelam (guest appearance)
 Madhu Bangarappa as Sivasakthi
 Archana as Sharada
 Umashree as Pankaja
 Tara as Inspector Anu
 Bharath
 Doddanna as Criminal Lawyer Yeluru Venkata Ramana
 Satyajith as Criminal Lawyer Satyajith
 Rekha Das
 Honnavalli Krishna as Aadithya's father
 Dayanand

Soundtrack 
The soundtrack of the film was composed by Rajesh Ramanath.

Audio On: Akash Audio

References 

1996 films
1990s Kannada-language films
1990s action drama films
Indian action drama films
Films scored by Rajesh Ramnath
1996 drama films